There were 1,224 symphony orchestras in the United States as of 2014. Some U.S. orchestras maintain a full 52-week performing season, but most are small and have shorter seasons.  As of 2007, there were 117 U.S. orchestras with annual budgets of $2.5 million or more.

Critics in the 1950s identified five American orchestras as the Big Five, those considered leaders in "musical excellence, calibre of musicianship, total contract weeks, weekly basic wages, recording guarantees, and paid vacations." The five were the New York Philharmonic, Boston Symphony Orchestra, Chicago Symphony Orchestra, Philadelphia Orchestra, and Cleveland Orchestra. But the concept and the list are now outmoded. Music critics today include more orchestras on their lists of "top" American orchestras.

Notable U.S. orchestras are listed here by state.  Youth orchestras are listed in a separate list of youth orchestras in the United States. For orchestras in other countries, see list of symphony orchestras.

Alabama
 Alabama Symphony Orchestra (Birmingham)
 Huntsville Symphony Orchestra
 Mobile Symphony Orchestra
 Montgomery Symphony Orchestra
 Tuscaloosa Symphony Orchestra

Alaska
 Anchorage Symphony Orchestra
 Juneau Symphony

Arizona

 Flagstaff Symphony Orchestra
 Phoenix Symphony
 Tucson Symphony Orchestra

Arkansas

 Arkansas Symphony Orchestra
 Symphony of Northwest Arkansas
 Texarkana Symphony Orchestra

California

 Bakersfield Symphony Orchestra
 California Symphony
 California Philharmonic Orchestra
 Fremont Symphony Orchestra
 Golden State Pops Orchestra
 Hollywood Bowl Orchestra
 Hollywood Chamber Orchestra
 Hollywood Studio Symphony
 Hollywood Symphony Orchestra
 Long Beach Symphony Orchestra
 Los Angeles Chamber Orchestra
 Los Angeles Philharmonic
 Modesto Symphony Orchestra
 New Century Chamber Orchestra
 New West Symphony
 North State Symphony
 Oakland East Bay Symphony
 Pacific Symphony
 Pasadena Symphony
 Peninsula Symphony
 Redwood Symphony
 Sacramento Philharmonic Orchestra
 San Bernardino Symphony
 San Diego Symphony
 San Francisco Chamber Orchestra
 San Francisco Symphony
 Santa Barbara Symphony Orchestra
 Santa Cruz County Symphony
 Southeast Symphony
 Stockton Symphony
 Symphony Silicon Valley
 Valley Symphony Orchestra (LAVC)

Colorado

 Aspen Chamber Symphony
 Aurora Symphony Orchestra
 Colorado Springs Philharmonic
 Colorado Symphony
 Boulder Philharmonic Orchestra

Connecticut

 Hartford Symphony Orchestra
 New Haven Symphony Orchestra
 Yale Symphony Orchestra

Delaware
 Delaware Symphony Orchestra

District of Columbia

 Kennedy Center Opera House Orchestra
 National Symphony Orchestra

Florida

 Florida Orchestra
 Jacksonville Symphony Orchestra
 New World Symphony Orchestra (Miami)
 Ocala Symphony Orchestra (formerly Central Florida Symphony Orchestra)
 Orlando Philharmonic Orchestra
 Orlando Pops Orchestra
 Sarasota Orchestra (formerly Florida West Coast Symphony)
 Tallahassee Symphony Orchestra

Georgia

 Albany Symphony Orchestra
 Athens Symphony Orchestra
 Atlanta Pops Symphony Orchestra
 Atlanta Symphony Orchestra
 Augusta Symphony Orchestra
 New Trinity Baroque
 Rome Symphony Orchestra

Hawaii
 Hawaii Symphony Orchestra

Illinois

 Belleville Philharmonic Society
 Champaign Urbana Symphony Orchestra
 Chicago Sinfonietta
 Chicago Symphony Orchestra
 Civic Orchestra of Chicago 
 Elgin Symphony Orchestra
 Grant Park Symphony Orchestra
 Illinois Philharmonic Orchestra
 Lyric Opera of Chicago
 Music of the Baroque
 Peoria Symphony Orchestra
 Quad City Symphony Orchestra
 Rockford Symphony Orchestra
 Urbana Pops Orchestra

Indiana

 Carmel Symphony Orchestra
 Evansville Philharmonic Orchestra
 Fort Wayne Philharmonic Orchestra
 Indianapolis Symphony Orchestra
 Northwest Indiana Symphony Orchestra

Iowa

 Des Moines Symphony
 Dubuque Symphony Orchestra
 Orchestra Iowa, Cedar Rapids
 Quad City Symphony Orchestra
 Sioux City Symphony Orchestra

Kansas

 Kansas City Symphony
 Wichita Symphony Orchestra

Kentucky

 Lexington Philharmonic Orchestra
 Louisville Orchestra

Louisiana

 Baton Rouge Symphony Orchestra
 Lake Charles Symphony
 Louisiana Philharmonic Orchestra (New Orleans)
 Monroe Symphony Orchestra
 Shreveport Symphony Orchestra

Maine

 Augusta Symphony Orchestra
 Bangor Symphony Orchestra
 Portland Symphony Orchestra

Maryland

 Annapolis Symphony Orchestra
 Baltimore Symphony Orchestra
 Baltimore Chamber Orchestra
 Baltimore Philharmonia
 Concert Artists of Baltimore
 Maryland Symphony Orchestra
 National Philharmonic at Strathmore
 Soulful Symphony
 Susquehanna Symphony Orchestra
 Symphony Number One

Massachusetts

 Boston Baroque
 Boston Civic Symphony
 Boston Classical Orchestra
 Boston Modern Orchestra Project
 Boston Philharmonic Orchestra
 Boston Pops Orchestra
 Boston Symphony Orchestra
 Boston Youth Symphony Orchestra
 Brockton Symphony Orchestra
 Cape Cod Symphony Orchestra
 Handel and Haydn Society
 Harvard Radcliffe Orchestra
 Lexington Symphony
 Longwood Symphony Orchestra
 Melrose Symphony Orchestra
 New England Philharmonic
 New Philharmonia Orchestra of Massachusetts
 North Shore Philharmonic Orchestra
 Pro Arte Chamber Orchestra of Boston
 Springfield Symphony Orchestra
 Waltham Symphony Orchestra
 Wellesley Symphony Orchestra

Michigan

 Ann Arbor Symphony Orchestra
 Detroit Symphony Orchestra
 Grand Rapids Symphony
 Jackson Symphony Orchestra
 Kalamazoo Symphony Orchestra
 Lansing Symphony Orchestra
 Michigan Philharmonic
 Traverse Symphony Orchestra
 West Shore Symphony Orchestra

Minnesota

 Bloomington Symphony Orchestra
 Duluth Superior Symphony Orchestra
 Fargo-Moorhead Symphony Orchestra
 Minnesota Orchestra
 Minnesota Philharmonic Orchestra
 Saint Paul Chamber Orchestra

Mississippi

 Mississippi Symphony Orchestra (Jackson)
 North Mississippi Symphony Orchestra (Tupelo)
 Southern Mississippi Symphony Orchestra (Hattiesburg)

Missouri

 Kansas City Symphony
 Missouri Symphony
 Ozark Festival Orchestra
 Saint Louis Symphony Orchestra
 University City Symphony Orchestra

Montana

 Billings Symphony Orchestra
 Helena Symphony Orchestra

Nebraska

 Omaha Symphony Orchestra
 Kearney Symphony Orchestra

Nevada

 Las Vegas Philharmonic Orchestra
 Reno Philharmonic Orchestra

New Hampshire

 New Hampshire Symphony Orchestra

New Jersey

 New Jersey Symphony Orchestra
 Princeton Symphony Orchestra
 Princeton University Orchestra
 Symphony in C

New Mexico
 Santa Fe Symphony Orchestra and Chorus

New York

 Albany Symphony Orchestra
 American Classical Orchestra
 American Composers Orchestra
 American Symphony Orchestra
 Astoria Symphony
 Binghamton Philharmonic
 Brooklyn Symphony Orchestra
 Buffalo Philharmonic Orchestra
 Cayuga Chamber Orchestra, Ithaca
 Chamber Orchestra of New York
 Chautauqua Symphony Orchestra
 The Little Orchestra Society
 Long Island Philharmonic
 NBC Symphony Orchestra
 New York Philharmonic
 New York Pops
 New York Symphony Orchestra
 Orchestra of St. Luke's
 Orpheus Chamber Orchestra
 Rochester Philharmonic Orchestra
 Westchester Philharmonic

North Carolina

 Asheville Symphony Orchestra
 North Carolina Symphony
 Charlotte Symphony Orchestra

North Dakota

 Fargo-Moorhead Symphony Orchestra
 Greater Grand Forks Symphony Orchestra
 Minot Symphony Orchestra

Ohio

 Akron Symphony Orchestra
 Canton Symphony Orchestra
 Cincinnati Symphony Orchestra
 Cincinnati Pops Orchestra
 Cleveland Orchestra
 Cleveland Pops Orchestra
 Columbus Symphony Orchestra
 Dayton Philharmonic Orchestra
 Toledo Symphony Orchestra
 Youngstown Symphony Orchestra

Oklahoma

 Oklahoma City Philharmonic
 Tulsa Symphony Orchestra

Oregon

 Eugene Symphony
 Columbia Gorge Sinfonietta
 Hillsboro Symphony Orchestra
 Oregon East Symphony
 Oregon Mozart Players
 Oregon Symphony
 Portland Chamber Orchestra
 Portland Columbia Symphony
 Portland Youth Philharmonic

Pennsylvania

 Allentown Symphony Orchestra
 Chamber Orchestra of Philadelphia
 Erie Philharmonic
 Harrisburg Symphony Orchestra
 Johnstown Symphony Orchestra
 Lancaster Symphony Orchestra
 Lansdowne Symphony Orchestra
 Old York Road Symphony
 Orchestra 2001
 Philadelphia Orchestra
 Philadelphia Virtuosi Chamber Orchestra
 Philly Pops
 Pittsburgh Symphony Orchestra

Puerto Rico

 Puerto Rico Symphony Orchestra

Rhode Island

 Brown University Orchestra
 Rhode Island Philharmonic Orchestra

South Carolina

 Beaufort Symphony Orchestra
 Charleston Symphony Orchestra
 Greenville Symphony Orchestra
 Lake Murray Symphony Orchestra
 South Carolina Philharmonic
 Long Bay Symphony Orchestra

South Dakota

 Black Hills Symphony Orchestra, Rapid City
 South Dakota Symphony Orchestra, Sioux Falls

Tennessee

 Chattanooga Symphony and Opera
 Jackson Symphony Orchestra
 Knoxville Symphony Orchestra
 Memphis Symphony Orchestra
 Nashville Symphony Orchestra
 Oak Ridge Symphony Orchestra

Texas

 Austin Symphony Orchestra
 Dallas Symphony Orchestra
 Dallas Chamber Symphony
 Fort Worth Symphony Orchestra
 Houston Symphony
 Lubbock Symphony Orchestra
 River Oaks Chamber Orchestra
 San Antonio Symphony
 Symphony of Southeast Texas
 University of North Texas Symphony Orchestra
 Valley Symphony Orchestra

Utah

 American West Symphony of Sandy
 Orchestra at Temple Square
 Salt Lake Symphony
 Utah Symphony
 Utah Valley Symphony

Vermont

 Vermont Symphony Orchestra

Virginia

 Fairfax Symphony Orchestra
 Richmond Symphony Orchestra
 Virginia Symphony Orchestra
 Roanoke Symphony Orchestra

Washington

 Northwest Sinfonia
 Northwest Symphony Orchestra
 Seattle Philharmonic Orchestra
 Seattle Symphony Orchestra
 Spokane Symphony
 Walla Walla Symphony

West Virginia

 West Virginia Symphony Orchestra
 Wheeling Symphony

Wisconsin

 Beloit-Janesville Symphony Orchestra
 Central Wisconsin Symphony Orchestra
 Chippewa Valley Symphony
 Madison Symphony Orchestra
 Milwaukee Symphony Orchestra
 Wisconsin Chamber Orchestra

See also
 League of American Orchestras
 Pops orchestra

References

Symphony orchestras in the United States
 List of symphony orchestras in the United States
Symphony orchestras in the United States
Orchestras
United States
United States, symphony

de:Liste der Orchester